Cop Tales 2000 is a book about the voices and lives of real cops. The book is written by Ed Dee, Paul Bishop, Jim Defilippi, Ernest W. Dorling, Liz Defranco, Gina Gallo, Marlene Loos, Marilyn A. Olsen, and Keith Bettinger.

2000 non-fiction books
Non-fiction crime books